Aşağıçavuş can refer to:

 Aşağıçavuş, Çankırı
 Aşağıçavuş, Yenice